Cody Allen Zeller (born October 5, 1992) is an American professional basketball player for the Miami Heat of the National Basketball Association (NBA).  He played college basketball for the Indiana Hoosiers. Zeller was selected with the fourth pick in the 2013 NBA draft by the then-Charlotte Bobcats. He is the brother of NBA players Tyler and Luke, and the nephew of former NBA player Al Eberhard.

High school career
In his freshman year of high school, Zeller averaged 2.5 points and 1.4 rebounds per game as his team, the Washington Hatchets, won a Class 3A IHSAA state championship. During his sophomore season, he averaged 15.0 points and 6.8 rebounds. In his junior season, Zeller led Washington to a Class 3A state championship, averaging 20.5 points and 11.4 rebounds per game. Following that season he was named an Indiana Junior All-Star. In his senior year of high school, Zeller averaged 24.6 points per game, 13.1 rebounds per game and 3.3 assists per game while leading the Hatchets to the Class 3A IHSAA state championship, the third title of his career. Zeller led the Indiana Senior All-Stars to a two-game sweep of the Kentucky All-Stars. He played AAU basketball for the Indiana Elite program and led the USA 2011 squad to the Adidas Nations Championship in Chicago during the summer of 2010.

Following the end of his senior season, Zeller was named Indiana Mr. Basketball, the state's highest honor for high school players and an award both of his elder brothers also won. Zeller became the 26th Mr. Basketball from the state of Indiana to play for the Hoosiers. He was a 2011 McDonald's All American player and scored 10 points, pulled down three rebounds and had three assists in the nationally acclaimed all-star game. Other honors Zeller won in his high school career include first-team All-State honors from the Indiana Basketball Coaches Association, the Gatorade Player of the Year accolades in Indiana, and a second-team Parade All-American. According to ESPN Zeller was the 13th best overall recruit in 2011. Scout.com had him rated 12th nationally and third at his position, while Rivals.com had him slotted 15th in the country and fourth at his position.

College career
On November 12, 2010, Zeller committed to play for Indiana University, turning down offers from North Carolina and Butler. Upon his commitment he was labeled "the savior of Indiana basketball." At the time Coach Tom Crean noted, "He's the most mentally focused kid I've ever recruited ... I see a young man that has mental toughness that is not normal."  Zeller was nicknamed "The Big Handsome" during his time at IU.

Freshman season

In Zeller's first year as a Hoosier during the 2011–12 season he led the team with 15.6 points and 6.6 rebounds per game while shooting 62.3 percent (200-of-321) from the field and 75.5 percent (163-of-216) from the free-throw line. He ranked fourth in the country in field goal percentage, led the Big Ten Conference and posted the second-highest percentage in school history. His offensive rating of 126.8 ranked him 14th nationwide. Zeller was the Big Ten's Freshman of the Year, as voted on by the coaches, after earning Big Ten Freshman of the Week seven times. He was also Second Team All-Big Ten and a First Team Freshman All-American. He was a finalist for the Wayman Tisdale Award (USBWA National Freshman of the Year) and was a candidate for the John Wooden Award and Oscar Robertson Trophy.

With the addition of Zeller to the team, the Hoosiers' record in 2011–12 improved by fifteen games over the prior season, making it the largest single turnaround in the NCAA that year. The Hoosiers earned a number four seed in the 2012 NCAA Tournament and defeated New Mexico State in the second round. After defeating VCU in the third round, the Hoosiers lost in the Sweet Sixteen to Kentucky, the eventual national champions.

Sophomore season
Although projected to be a top ten pick in the 2012 NBA draft, Zeller decided to return for his sophomore season at Indiana, along with teammate Christian Watford. In a statement issued by the Indiana Athletic Department, he said, "I grew up hoping that one day I would get the opportunity to play in the NBA, but at this point, I'm not ready for my college experience to be over...My college experience at IU this year has exceeded my expectations, on and off the court. I look forward to playing at Assembly Hall next year in front of the greatest fans in the country."

Due in part to Zeller's leadership, the Indiana Hoosiers finished the 2012–13 season as the outright Big Ten champions. He finished the regular season as the conference's third-highest scorer (16.8 points) and second highest rebounder (8.2), along with second in the league in shooting at 57% while only trailing teammate Victor Oladipo in the Big Ten.

Zeller accumulated numerous post-season awards. He was named a 2013 All-American by the USBWA (2nd Team) and Sporting News (3rd Team). He was also named First Team All-Big Ten by both the coaches and media, as well as a First Team Academic All-American.

At the end of his sophomore season, Zeller decided to enter the 2013 NBA draft, along with teammate Victor Oladipo.

Professional career

Charlotte Bobcats / Hornets (2013–2021)

2013–16: All-Rookie honors and later years 

Zeller was selected with the fourth overall pick in the 2013 NBA draft by the Charlotte Bobcats. On July 10, 2013, he signed his rookie scale contract with the Bobcats.

On March 31, 2014, he scored a season-high 15 points against the Washington Wizards. On April 5, 2014, he recorded his first career double-double with 12 points and 11 rebounds against the Cleveland Cavaliers. He appeared in all 82 regular season games and all four of Charlotte's playoff games. At the season's end, he was named to the NBA All-Rookie Second Team.

On November 28, 2014, Zeller recorded 15 points and 14 rebounds against the Golden State Warriors. On January 31, 2015, he scored a season-high 21 points in a 104–86 win over the Denver Nuggets.

On February 19, 2016, Zeller scored a career-high 23 points in a 98–95 win over the Milwaukee Bucks. He had five double-doubles during the season.

2016–21: Double-digit streaks and career-highs 
Despite missing the entire preseason because of a right knee injury, Zeller played in the Hornets' season opener on October 26, 2016, going 5 of 6 from the field for 15 points in 14 minutes in a 107–96 win over the Bucks. Five days later, he signed a four-year, $56 million contract extension with the Hornets. On November 18, 2016, he tied his career high with 23 points in a 100–96 win over the Atlanta Hawks. He averaged career highs in 2016–17 with 10.3 points and 6.5 rebounds.

Zeller played in the Hornets' season opener then missed the next four games. On December 6, 2017, in a 101–87 loss to the Warriors, Zeller suffered a torn medial meniscus in his left knee with 49 seconds left in the third quarter. He missed 27 games as a result, returning to action on February 2 against the Indiana Pacers. He missed games on February 28 and March 2 with a sore left knee. He later missed the final 16 games of the season with knee soreness. Due to injury, he appeared in a career-low 33 games in 2017–18.

On November 28, 2018, Zeller scored a then season-high 19 points in a 108–94 win over the Hawks. On December 14, in a 126–124 overtime loss to the New York Knicks, Zeller had season highs in points (21) and rebounds (13) to record the first 20-point, 10-rebound game of his career and tally his first double-double of the season. It also marked his third-straight double-digit scoring performance. On December 31, Zeller suffered a broken right hand against the Orlando Magic. He was subsequently ruled out for four to six weeks after undergoing surgery. He returned to action on February 5 against the Los Angeles Clippers after missing 16 games. On February 25, he made 13 of 14 shots from the field and finished with a career-high 28 points in a 121–110 loss to the Warriors.

Portland Trail Blazers (2021–2022)
On August 4, 2021, Zeller signed with the Portland Trail Blazers. He was waived on February 8, 2022, as a result of the CJ McCollum trade.

On September 25, 2022, Zeller signed with the Utah Jazz. On October 15, he was waived.

Miami Heat (2023–present) 
On February 20, 2023, Zeller signed with the Miami Heat.

Career statistics

NBA

Regular season

|-
| style="text-align:left;"| 
| style="text-align:left;"| Charlotte
| 82 || 3 || 17.3 || .426 || .000 || .730 || 4.3 || 1.1 || .5 || .5 || 6.0
|-
| style="text-align:left;"| 
| style="text-align:left;"| Charlotte
| 62 || 45 || 24.0 || .461 || 1.000 || .774 || 5.8 || 1.6 || .5 || .8 || 7.6
|-
| style="text-align:left;"| 
| style="text-align:left;"| Charlotte
| 73 || 60 || 24.3 || .529 || .100 || .754 || 6.2 || 1.0 || .8 || .9 || 8.7
|-
| style="text-align:left;"| 
| style="text-align:left;"| Charlotte
| 62 || 58 || 27.8 || .571 || .000 || .679 || 6.5 || 1.6 || 1.0 || 1.0 || 10.3
|-
| style="text-align:left;"| 
| style="text-align:left;"| Charlotte
| 33 || 0 || 19.0 || .545 || .667 || .718 || 5.4 || .9 || .4 || .6 || 7.1
|-
| style="text-align:left;"| 
| style="text-align:left;"| Charlotte
| 49 || 47 || 25.4 || .551 || .273 || .787 || 6.8 || 2.1 || .8 || .8 || 10.1
|-
| style="text-align:left;"| 
| style="text-align:left;"| Charlotte
| 58 || 39 || 23.1 || .524 || .240 || .682 || 7.1 || 1.5 || .7 || .4 || 11.1
|-
| style="text-align:left;"| 
| style="text-align:left;"| Charlotte
| 48 || 21 || 20.9 || .559 || .143 || .714 || 6.8 || 1.8 || .6 || .4 || 9.4
|-
| style="text-align:left;"| 
| style="text-align:left;"| Portland
| 27 || 0 || 13.1 || .567 || .000 || .776 || 4.6 || .8 || .3 || .2 || 5.2
|- class="sortbottom"
| style="text-align:center;" colspan="2"| Career
| 494 || 273 || 22.2 || .520 || .221 || .731 || 6.0 || 1.4 || .6 || .6 || 8.5

Playoffs

|-
| style="text-align:left;"| 2014
| style="text-align:left;"| Charlotte
| 4 || 0 || 13.3 || .333 || .000 || .500 || 2.3 || .5 || .0 || .8 || 2.0
|-
| style="text-align:left;"| 2016
| style="text-align:left;"| Charlotte
| 7 || 2 || 19.6 || .553 || .000 || .810 || 5.3 || .3 || .1 || .4 || 8.4
|- class="sortbottom"
| style="text-align:center;" colspan="2"| Career
| 11 || 2 || 17.3 || .511 || .000 || .760 || 4.2 || .4 || .1 || .5 || 6.1

College

|-
| style="text-align:left;"| 2011–12
| style="text-align:left;"| Indiana
| 36 || 36 || 28.5 || .623 || – || .755 || 6.6 || 1.3 || 1.4 || 1.2 || 15.6
|-
| style="text-align:left;"| 2012–13
| style="text-align:left;"| Indiana
| 36 || 36 || 29.5 || .564 || .000 || .757 || 8.0 || 1.3 || 1.0 || 1.3 || 16.5
|- class="sortbottom"
| style="text-align:center;" colspan="2"| Career
| 72 || 72 || 29.0 || .592 || .000 || .756 || 7.3 || 1.3 || 1.2 || 1.2 || 16.1

Player profile
In college, analysts described Zeller as having "the outstanding combination of mobility, scoring instincts and aggressiveness", while also being "an incredibly agile and fluid big man who runs the floor well and has the explosiveness to play above the rim regularly." Zeller is also known for a "high basketball IQ" and unselfish play. Other commentators have noted his "high motor" and that he is "the best screen-and-roll frontcourt player in college basketball...He sprints to the screen, reads slips, and has great hands. He is hard to keep off the glass and has the versatility to play in the high post as well as on the baseline."

Personal life
Zeller is from Washington, Indiana and the nephew of former NBA player Al Eberhard. He is the youngest brother of former North Carolina and NBA center Tyler Zeller and former Notre Dame and Phoenix Suns forward-center Luke Zeller. Despite pressures brought on by unusually high expectations, commentators have noted his humility and work ethic, along with "dry wit and prankster's mirth." In May 2017, Zeller earned his bachelor's degree when he graduated from Indiana University's Kelley School of Business.

References

External links

Indiana Hoosiers bio

1992 births
Living people
All-American college men's basketball players
American men's basketball players
Basketball players from Indiana
Centers (basketball)
Charlotte Bobcats draft picks 
Charlotte Bobcats players
Charlotte Hornets players
Indiana Hoosiers men's basketball players
McDonald's High School All-Americans
Miami Heat players
Parade High School All-Americans (boys' basketball)
People from Washington, Indiana
Portland Trail Blazers players
Power forwards (basketball)
Utah Jazz players